21st FFCC Awards
December 23, 2016

Best Picture:
The Lobster

The 21st Florida Film Critics Circle Awards were held on December 23, 2016.

The nominations were announced on December 20, 2016, led by Moonlight with ten nominations.

Winners and nominees

Winners are listed at the top of each list in bold, while the runner-ups for each category are listed under them.

References

External links
 

2016 film awards
2010s